Krupa is a surname of Slavic origin, meaning "barley", usually found in Polish, Slovak, and eastern German regions. Notable people with the surname include:

Adam Krupa (born 1952), Polish footballer
Aleksander (Olek) Krupa (born 1947), Polish film and television actor
Alfred Krupa Sr. (1915-1989), Silesia born painter, inventor and sportsman
Alfred Freddy Krupa (born 1971), Croatian painter
Dawid Krupa (born 1980), Polish cyclist
Emil Krupa-Krupinsky (1872-1924), German portrait painter, genre painter and graphic artist
Gene Krupa (1909–1973), Polish-American jazz drummer, bandleader and composer
Jacek Krupa (born 1955), Polish politician
Jakub Krupa (born 1985), Czech handball player
Jeroen Krupa (born 2003), German footballer 
Joanna Krupa (born 1979), Polish-American model and actress
Joe Krupa (1933–2011), American football player
Joan Krupa, American educator, administrator, and member of the Illinois House of Representatives
Killi Krupa Rani (born 1965), member of the Indian Parliament
Krystyna Krupa (born 1939), Polish Olympic volleyball player
Monika Krupa (born 1977), Poland chess Woman Grandmaster
Paweł Krupa (born 1989), Polish handball player 
S. E. Krupa Rao (1939–1993), Indian pastor of the Convention of Baptist Churches of Northern Circars 
Stefania Krupa (1909–1981), Polish Olympic gymnast 
Tomáš Krupa (born 1972), Czech tennis player and coach
Urszula Krupa (born 1949), Polish politician
Władysław Krupa (1899–1969), Polish footballer
James Krupa (born 2000), first half human half bulldog

References

See also
 

Polish-language surnames